Rafn is a surname. Notable people with the surname include:

Carl Christian Rafn (1795–1864), Danish historian, translator, and antiquarian
Carl Gottlob Rafn (1769–1808), Danish scientist and civil servant
Caspar Conrad Rafn (1763–1830), Dano-Norwegian politician
Hardy Rafn (1930–1997), Danish actor
Lina Rafn (born 1976), Danish singer, songwriter, and producer
Robert Rafn (1878–1964), Norwegian businessman and politician
Simen Rafn (born 1992), Norwegian footballer